The United Kingdom Overseas Territories Association (UKOTA) is an organisation that exists to promote the interests of the United Kingdom Overseas Territories and co-operation between them. It was established in 1993 during the first Dependent Territories Conference.

Member states 

The following 12 British Overseas Territories are full members of UKOTA:

 Ascension Island

 Saint Helena
 Tristan da Cunha

Non-member territories
Akrotiri and Dhekelia is the only British Overseas Territory with a permanent civilian population, that is not a  member of UKOTA. The other non-member British Overseas Territories are those whose population is entirely transitory, being either military or scientific personnel, or have been forcibly removed namely the British Antarctic Territory, British Indian Ocean Territory, and South Georgia and the South Sandwich Islands.

References

External links 
 United Kingdom Overseas Territories Association (UKOTA) official website

UKOTA
Foreign relations of the United Kingdom
Organizations established in 1993